Pain Taleqan Rural District is in the Central District of Taleqan County, Alborz province, Iran. Formerly, it was in Taleqan District of Savojbolagh County, Tehran province, before the formation of Alborz province. At the census of 2006, its population was 6,018 in 1,875 households, and in the most recent census of 2016, it had decreased to 3,660 in 1,449 households. The largest of its 30 villages was Sang Bon, with 442 people.

References 

Taleqan County

Rural Districts of Alborz Province

Populated places in Alborz Province

Populated places in Taleqan County